Rhyssomatus lineaticollis, also known by its common name Milkweed stem weevil is a species of weevil whose adults feed on the stems of the common milkweed, Asclepias syriaca. It is also destructive to the rare and threatened milkweed species Asclepias meadii.

References 

Molytinae
Beetles of North America
Beetles described in 1824